África de las Heras Gavilán (Ceuta, Spain, 26 April 1909 – Moscow, Russia, 8 March 1988) was a Spanish-born communist, naturalized Soviet citizen, and a secret service agent who went by the code name "Patria", but also used the names "María Luisa de las Heras de Darbat","María de la Sierra","Patricia", "Ivonne", "María de las Heras", "Znoi" and "María Pavlovna". Originally a member of the Communist Party of Spain, de las Heras participated in various Soviet intelligence operations both during and after the Spanish Civil War. Though she had been exhibited by Pavel Sudoplatov as the secretary of Trotsky in Norway and in Mexico, the number of assassination teams to kill Trotsky that were assisted by de las Heras, was never known. Later she stopped her own direct actions and their support and trained other KGB agents in Moscow.

References

1909 births
1988 deaths
Spanish communists
People from Ceuta
Spanish people of the Spanish Civil War (Republican faction)
KGB officers
Exiles of the Spanish Civil War in the Soviet Union
Spanish women
Spanish spies
Women spies
Spanish women of the Spanish Civil War (Republican faction)
Women in the Spanish Civil War
Female wartime spies